Yongning Subdistrict is a subdistrict in Yitong Manchu Autonomous County, Jilin, China. , it has 5 residential communities and 3 villages under its administration.

See also 
 List of township-level divisions of Jilin

References 

Township-level divisions of Jilin
Yitong Manchu Autonomous County